The 2013 Trofeo Alfredo Binda-Comune di Cittiglio was the 38th running of the women's Trofeo Alfredo Binda-Comune di Cittiglio, a women's bicycle race in Italy and the second World Cup race of the 2013 UCI Women's Road World Cup.

Results

Source

World Cup standings
Standings after 2 of 8 2013 UCI Women's Road World Cup races.

References

External links
  

Trofeo Alfredo Binda-Comune di Cittiglio
2013 in Italian sport
2013 UCI Women's Road World Cup